Mount Beasor Primitive Baptist Church is a historic church in Wakulla County, Florida. It was added to the National Register of Historic Places on October 17, 2012. The church's address is 120 Mount Beasor Road and it is located in the vicinity of Sopchoppy. The church was established in 1853.

See also
National Register of Historic Places listings in Wakulla County, Florida

References

Churches on the National Register of Historic Places in Florida
Churches in Wakulla County, Florida
National Register of Historic Places in Wakulla County, Florida
1853 establishments in Florida
Churches completed in 1853
Primitive Baptists